Daniel Diehl (born October 26, 2005) is an American competitive swimmer. He is a world junior record holder in the long course 4×100 meter freestyle relay and the short course 4×50 meter mixed freestyle relay. At the 2022 Junior Pan Pacific Championships, he won gold medals in the 100 meter backstroke, 4×100 meter freestyle relay, 4×100 meter medley relay, and the 4×100 meter mixed medley relay.

Background
Diehl was born October 26, 2005, in Maryland, United States. He trains under the guidance of coach Brian Dowling as part of the Cumberland YMCA swim team.

Career

2021–2022

2021 Swimming World Cup
Swimming the first leg of the 4×50 meter mixed freestyle relay at the 2021 FINA Swimming World Cup stop held in Berlin, Germany, Diehl contributed to a gold medal-win in a world junior record time of 1:31.50 with finals relay teammates Quintin McCarty, Kristina Paegle, and Carly Novelline. Six days later, at the stop held at Danube Arena in Budapest, Hungary, he helped win the gold medal in the 4×50 meter mixed freestyle relay again, this time splitting a 22.45 to contribute to the final mark of 1:32.34. The following day, he won the bronze medal in the 100 meter backstroke, finishing 1.77 seconds behind gold medalist and fellow American Tom Shields with a time of 52.27 seconds.

2022 International Team Trials
The following year, at the 2022 USA Swimming International Team Trials, held in Greensboro in April, Diehl earned spots on the United States roster for the 2022 Junior Pan Pacific Swimming Championships based on his results in the 100 meter backstroke, in which he placed eighth with a time of 54.15 seconds. Leading up to the Championships, he competed at the 2022 YMCA National Championships, winning national titles in five events, including the 200 meter backstroke where he won the event with a personal best time of 1:57.62 at 16 years of age.

2022 Junior Pan Pacific Championships

Commencing competition on day one at Veterans Memorial Aquatic Center for the 2022 Junior Pan Pacific Swimming Championships, held in Honolulu in August, Diehl set a new Championships record with a personal best time of 53.40 seconds in the morning preliminaries of the 100 meter backstroke and qualified for the final ranking first. In the evening finals session, he won the gold medal with another Championships record time, this time finishing over one full second ahead of the second-place finisher with a personal best of 53.27, which set a new National Age Group record in the event for the boys 15–16 age group. Later in the finals session, he led-off the 4×100 meter mixed medley relay with a 53.42 to help win the gold medal in a new Championships record time of 3:46.83. The following day, he won the b-final of the 100 meter freestyle with a time of 50.08 seconds. In the morning on day three, he swam a 1:59.55 in the preliminaries of the 200 meter backstroke to qualify for the b-final ranking fastest out of all b-final qualifiers. He withdrew from further competition in the event prior to the start of the finals. Instead, he focused on the final of the 4×100 meter freestyle relay, swimming the fastest split time of his relay teammates with a 48.66 to contribute to a final time of 3:15.79, which set a world junior record and Championships record in the event and won the gold medal.

Day four of four, Diehl finished in a time of 23.22 seconds in the preliminaries of the 50 meter freestyle to qualify for the b-final ranking second behind Thomas Heilman. He won the b-final by over two-tenths of a second, finishing first in a time of 23.32 seconds. Later in the session he led-off the 4×100 meter medley relay with a 54.24, helping achieve a Championships record time of 3:36.65 and win the gold medal.

2022 Swimming World Cup
At the 2022 FINA Swimming World Cup stop conducted in short course meters and held at the Indiana University Natatorium in Indianapolis in November, Diehl swam a personal best time of 1:53.71 in the morning preliminary heats of the 200 meter backstroke on day one, advancing to the final ranking sixth. For his second event of the morning, he swam a personal best time of 54.15 seconds in the 100 meter individual medley and placed twelfth. In the evening session, he took 0.42 seconds off his 200 meter backstroke personal best time with a 1:53.29 and placed eighth. Day two of three, he placed seventeenth in the 50 meter backstroke with a time of 24.29 seconds. Later in the morning, he finished in a time of 48.66 seconds in the preliminary heats of the 100 meter freestyle, placing twenty-fifth. The final day, he placed fourteenth in the 100 meter backstroke with a time of 52.29 seconds.

2022 U.S. Open Championships
On day two of the 2022 U.S. Open Swimming Championships, December 1, Diehl swam a personal best time of 2:00.50 in the preliminary heats of the 200 meter individual medley and qualified for the final ranking second. He won the bronze medal in the evening final, this time finishing in a personal best time of 1:59.89, which was 3.37 seconds behind gold medalist Chase Kalisz. The morning of day three, he set a new National Age Group record for the boys 17–18 age group in the 100 meter backstroke preliminaries with a time of 53.11 seconds, which qualified him to the final ranking first and lowered the former record of 53.38 seconds set by Ryan Murphy in 2013 by 0.27 seconds. In the evening, he won the gold medal in another personal best and National Age Group record time of 53.07 seconds. The final morning, he tied his personal best time in the 200 meter backstroke in the preliminaries with a time of 1:57.62 and qualified for the final ranking first. For the evening final, his last race of the Championships, he swam 1.21 seconds faster than in the morning, winning the gold medal with a personal best time of 1:56.41.

2022 Winter Junior National Championships
The following week, Diehl placed second in the 200 yard individual medley at the 2022 Winter Junior US National Championships edition East with a personal best time of 1:43.01. For day three, he swam personal best times of 46.40 seconds and 46.01 seconds in the preliminary heats and final, respectively, of the 100 yard backstroke and placed fourth. On the fourth and final day, he won the 200 yard backstroke in the evening finals session with a personal best time of 1:39.62, which was 2.10 seconds faster than the personal best time of 1:41.72 he swam in the morning to qualify for the final ranking first.

International championships

Personal best times

Long course meters (50 m pool)

Short course meters (25 m pool)

Legend: h – preliminary heat

Short course yards (25 yd pool)

World records

World junior records

Long course meters (50 m pool)

Short course meters (25 m pool)

References

External links
 

2005 births
Living people
Swimmers from Maryland
American male backstroke swimmers
American male freestyle swimmers
21st-century American people